In set theory, a Rowbottom cardinal, introduced by  , is a certain kind of large cardinal number.

An uncountable cardinal number  is said to be - Rowbottom if for every function f: [κ]<ω → λ (where λ < κ) there is a set H of order type  that is quasi-homogeneous for f, i.e., for every n, the f-image of the set of n-element subsets of H has <  elements.  is Rowbottom if it is  - Rowbottom.

Every Ramsey cardinal is Rowbottom, and every Rowbottom cardinal is Jónsson. By a theorem of Kleinberg, the theories ZFC + “there is a Rowbottom cardinal” and ZFC + “there is a Jónsson cardinal” are equiconsistent.

In general, Rowbottom cardinals need not be large cardinals in the usual sense: Rowbottom cardinals could be singular. It is an open question whether ZFC + “ is Rowbottom” is consistent. If it is, it has much higher consistency strength than the existence of a Rowbottom cardinal. The axiom of determinacy does imply that  is Rowbottom (but contradicts the axiom of choice).

References 

 

Large cardinals